is a 1984 Japanese film directed by Sōgo Ishii. Its special effects were supervised by Takashi Ito.

Awards and nominations
6th Yokohama Film Festival 
 Won: Best Newcomer - Youki Kudoh
8th Best Film

See also
 List of Japanese films of 1984

References

1984 films
Films directed by Sōgo Ishii
1980s Japanese-language films
Films about dysfunctional families
1980s Japanese films